Sambrial , is a tehsil located in Sialkot District, Punjab, Pakistan. It is a newly created subdivision, the city of Sambrial is the capital.

References

Sialkot District
Tehsils of Punjab, Pakistan